Enrico Marconi, known in Poland as Henryk Marconi (7 January 1792 in Rome – 21 February 1863 in Warsaw), was an Italian-Polish architect who spent most of his life in Congress Poland.

Initially he was taught by his father Leander, later on, between 1806 and 1810, he studied both at the University of Bologna and at the Academy of Fine Arts of Bologna. In 1822 he was commissioned by general Ludwik Michał Pac to complete his palace in Dowspuda (then in Congress Poland, now in north-eastern Poland). He settled in Warsaw, where from 1827 he worked for the Council of State and where he became professor (1851-1858) at the Academy of Fine Arts.

Enrico Marconi married a daughter of general Pac's gardener, Małgorzata Heiton, who came from a Scottish family settled in Poland. One of their sons, Leandro Marconi, also became an architect.

Selected works

 Hotel Europejski in Warsaw
 Mausoleum of Stanisław Kostka Potocki in Wilanów
 The Pumping Room Building at Wilanów Palace
 Rail stations in Warsaw, Granica and Sosnowiec on the Warsaw-Vienna Railway
 Water tower in Saxon Garden, Warsaw
 Great Synagogue, Łomża
 All Saints Church, Warsaw
 Pawiak prison, Warsaw

References

1792 births
1863 deaths
Artists from Rome
University of Bologna alumni
19th-century Italian architects
Accademia di Belle Arti di Bologna alumni